The National Football League (NFL) is a professional American football league that consists of 32 teams, divided equally between the American Football Conference (AFC) and the National Football Conference (NFC). The NFL is one of the major professional sports leagues in the United States and Canada and the highest professional level of American football in the world. Each NFL season begins with a three-week preseason in August, followed by the 18-week regular season which runs from early September to early January, with each team playing 17 games and having one bye week. Following the conclusion of the regular season, seven teams from each conference (four division winners and three wild card teams) advance to the playoffs, a single-elimination tournament that culminates in the Super Bowl, which is contested in February and is played between the AFC and NFC conference champions. The league is headquartered in New York City.

The NFL was formed in 1920 as the American Professional Football Association (APFA) before renaming itself the National Football League for the 1922 season. After initially determining champions through end-of-season standings, a playoff system was implemented in 1933 that culminated with the NFL Championship Game until 1966. Following an agreement to merge the NFL with the rival American Football League (AFL), the Super Bowl was first held in 1967 to determine a champion between the best teams from the two leagues and has remained as the final game of each NFL season since the merger was completed in 1970. 

The NFL is the wealthiest professional sports league in the world by revenue and the sports league with the most valuable teams. The NFL also has the highest average attendance (67,591) of any professional sports league in the world and is the most popular sports league in the United States. The Super Bowl is also among the biggest club sporting events in the world, with the individual games accounting for many of the most watched television programs in American history and all occupying the Nielsen's Top 5 tally of the all-time most watched U.S. television broadcasts by 2015.

The Green Bay Packers hold the most combined NFL championships with thirteen, winning nine titles before the Super Bowl era and four Super Bowls afterwards. Since the creation of the Super Bowl, the New England Patriots and Pittsburgh Steelers are tied for the most Super Bowl victories at six each. The Kansas City Chiefs are the reigning league champions, as they defeated the Philadelphia Eagles 38–35 in Super Bowl LVII on February 12, 2023, to mark the end of the 2022 season.

History

Founding and history 
On August 20, 1920, a meeting was held by representatives of the Akron Pros, Canton Bulldogs, Cleveland Indians, and Dayton Triangles at the Jordan and Hupmobile auto showroom in Canton, Ohio. This meeting resulted in the formation of the American Professional Football Conference (APFC), a group who, according to the Canton Evening Repository, intended to "raise the standard of professional football in every way possible, to eliminate bidding for players between rival clubs and to secure cooperation in the formation of schedules".

Another meeting was held on September 17, 1920, with representatives from teams from four states: Akron, Canton, Cleveland, and Dayton from Ohio; the Hammond Pros and Muncie Flyers from Indiana; the Rochester Jeffersons from New York; and the Rock Island Independents, Decatur Staleys, and Racine (Chicago) Cardinals from Illinois. The league was renamed to the American Professional Football Association (APFA). The league elected Jim Thorpe as its first president, and consisted of 14 teams (the Buffalo All-Americans, Chicago Tigers, Columbus Panhandles and Detroit Heralds joined the league during the year). The Massillon Tigers from Massillon, Ohio was also at the September 17 meeting, but did not field a team in 1920. Only two of these teams, the Decatur Staleys (now the Chicago Bears) and the Chicago Cardinals (now the Arizona Cardinals), remain in the NFL.

Although the league did not maintain official standings for its 1920 inaugural season and teams played schedules that included non-league opponents, the APFA awarded the Akron Pros the championship by virtue of their  record. The first event occurred on September 26, 1920, when the Rock Island Independents defeated the non-league St. Paul Ideals 48–0 at Douglas Park. On October 3, 1920, the first full week of league play occurred.
The following season resulted in the Chicago Staleys controversially winning the title over the Buffalo All-Americans. On June 24, 1922, the APFA changed its name to the National Football League (NFL).

In 1932, the season ended with the Chicago Bears and the Portsmouth Spartans tied for first in the league standings. At the time, teams were ranked on a single table and the team with the highest winning percentage (not including ties, which were not counted towards the standings) at the end of the season was declared the champion; the only tiebreaker was that in the event of a tie if two teams played twice in a season, the result of the second game determined the title (the source of the 1921 controversy). This method had been used since the league's creation in 1920, but no situation had been encountered where two teams were tied for first. The league quickly determined that a playoff game between Chicago and Portsmouth was needed to decide the league's champion. The teams were originally scheduled to play the playoff game, officially a regular-season game that would count towards the regular season standings, at Wrigley Field in Chicago, but a combination of heavy snow and extreme cold forced the game to be moved indoors to Chicago Stadium, which did not have a regulation-size football field. Playing with altered rules to accommodate the smaller playing field, the Bears won the game 9–0 and thus won the championship. Fan interest in the de facto championship game led the NFL, beginning in 1933, to split into two divisions with a championship game to be played between the division champions. The 1934 season also marked the first of twelve seasons in which African Americans were absent from the league. The de facto ban was rescinded in 1946, following public pressure and coinciding with the removal of a similar ban in Major League Baseball.

The NFL was always the largest professional football league in the United States; it nevertheless faced numerous rival professional leagues through the 1930s and 1940s. Rival leagues included at least three separate American Football Leagues and the All-America Football Conference (AAFC), on top of various regional leagues of varying caliber. Three NFL teams trace their histories to these rival leagues; the Los Angeles Rams who came from a 1936 iteration of the American Football League, and the Cleveland Browns and San Francisco 49ers, both from the AAFC. By the 1950s, the NFL had an effective monopoly on professional football in the United States; its only competition in North America was the professional Canadian football circuit, which formally became the Canadian Football League (CFL) in 1958. With Canadian football being a different football code than the American game, the CFL established a niche market in Canada and still survives as an independent league.

A new professional league, the fourth American Football League (AFL), began to play in 1960. The upstart AFL began to challenge the established NFL in popularity, gaining lucrative television contracts and engaging in a bidding war with the NFL for free agents and draft picks. The two leagues announced a merger on June 8, 1966, to take full effect in 1970. In the meantime, the leagues would hold a common draft and championship game. The game, the Super Bowl, was held four times before the merger, with the NFL winning Super Bowl I and Super Bowl II, and the AFL winning Super Bowl III and Super Bowl IV. After the league merged, it was reorganized into two conferences: the National Football Conference (NFC), consisting of most of the pre-merger NFL teams, and the American Football Conference (AFC), consisting of all of the AFL teams as well as three pre-merger NFL teams.

Today, the NFL is the most popular sports league in North America – with much of the league's growth and popularity attributable to former Commissioner Pete Rozelle, who led the league from 1960 to 1989. Overall annual attendance increased from 3 million at the beginning of his tenure to 17 million by the end of his tenure, and 400 million global viewers watched 1989's Super Bowl XXIII. The NFL established NFL Properties in 1963. The league's licensing wing, NFL Properties, earns the league billions of dollars annually; Rozelle's tenure also marked the creation of NFL Charities and a national partnership with United Way. Paul Tagliabue was elected as commissioner to succeed Rozelle; his 17-year tenure, which ended in 2006, was marked by large increases in television contracts and the addition of four expansion teams, as well as the introduction of league initiatives to increase the number of minorities in league and team management roles. The league's current Commissioner, Roger Goodell, has focused on reducing the number of illegal hits and making the sport safer, mainly through fining or suspending players who break rules. These actions are among many the NFL is taking to reduce concussions and improve player safety. Prior to 2021, the NFL had utilized race-based adjustments of dementia claims in the $1 billion settlement of concussion claims, which had been criticized by critics before the NFL decided to end what was called "race-norming".

Season and playoff development 

From 1920 to 1934, the NFL did not have a set number of games for teams to play, instead setting a minimum. The league mandated a twelve-game regular season for each team beginning in 1935, later shortening this to eleven games in 1937 and ten games in 1943, mainly due to World War II. After the war ended, the number of games returned to eleven games in 1946, and later back to twelve in 1947. The NFL went to a 14-game schedule in 1961, which it retained until switching to a 16-game schedule in 1978. In March 2021, the NFL officially adopted a 17-game schedule after gaining the agreement of the National Football League Players Association (NFLPA).

Having an odd number of games in the schedule will give half the teams nine games as the home team, while half the teams have only eight home games. To minimize the perceived benefit on competition of having more home games, the extra home game will be rotated between the two conferences each year. This is because playoff berths are allocated at the conference level, so all teams within the conference will have played the same number of home games.

The NFL operated in a two-conference system from 1933 to 1966, where the champions of each conference would meet in the NFL Championship Game. If two teams tied for the conference lead, they would meet in a one-game playoff to determine the conference champion. In 1967, the NFL expanded from 15 teams to 16 teams. Instead of just evening out the conferences by adding the expansion New Orleans Saints to the seven-member Western Conference, the NFL realigned the conferences and split each into two four-team divisions. The four division champions would meet in the NFL playoffs, a two-round playoff. The NFL also operated the Playoff Bowl (officially the Bert Bell Benefit Bowl) from 1960 to 1969. Effectively, a third-place game, pitting the two conference runners-up against each other, the league considers Playoff Bowls to have been exhibitions rather than playoff games. The league discontinued the Playoff Bowl in 1970 due to its perception as a game for losers.

Following the addition of the former AFL teams into the NFL in 1970, the NFL split into two conferences with three divisions each. The expanded league, now with twenty-six teams, would also feature an expanded eight-team playoff, the participants being the three division champions from each conference as well as one 'wild card' team (the team with the best win percentage) from each conference. In 1978, the league added a second wild card team from each conference, bringing the total number of playoff teams to ten, and a further two wild card teams were added in 1990 to bring the total to twelve. When the NFL expanded to 32 teams in 2002, the league realigned, changing the division structure from three divisions in each conference to four divisions in each conference. As each division champion gets a playoff bid, the number of wild card teams from each conference dropped from three to two. The playoffs expanded again in 2020, adding two more wild card teams to bring the total to 14 playoff teams.

Corporate structure 

At the corporate level, the National Football League considers itself a trade association made up of and financed by its 32 member teams. Up until 2015, the league was an unincorporated nonprofit 501(c)(6) association. Section 501(c)(6) of the Internal Revenue Code provides an exemption from federal income taxation for "Business leagues, chambers of commerce, real-estate boards, boards of trade, or professional football leagues (whether or not administering a pension fund for football players), not organized for profit and no part of the net earnings of which inures to the benefit of any private shareholder or individual." In contrast, each individual team (except the non-profit Green Bay Packers) is subject to tax because they make a profit.

The NFL gave up the tax-exempt status in 2015 following public criticism; in a letter to the club owners, Commissioner Roger Goodell labeled it a "distraction", saying "the effects of the tax-exempt status of the league office have been mischaracterized repeatedly in recent years… Every dollar of income generated through television rights fees, licensing agreements, sponsorships, ticket sales, and other means is earned by the 32 clubs and is taxable there. This will remain the case even when the league office and Management Council file returns as taxable entities, and the change in filing status will make no material difference to our business." As a result, the league office might owe around US$10 million in income taxes, but it is no longer required to disclose the salaries of its executive officers.

The league has three defined officers: the commissioner, secretary, and treasurer. Each conference has one defined officer, the president, which is essentially an honorary position with few powers and mostly ceremonial duties, including awarding the conference championship trophy.

The commissioner is elected by the affirmative vote of two-thirds or eighteen (whichever is greater) of the members of the league, while the president of each conference is elected by an affirmative vote of three-fourths or 10 of the conference members. The commissioner appoints the secretary and treasurer and has broad authority in disputes between clubs, players, coaches, and employees. He is the "principal executive officer" of the NFL and also has authority in hiring league employees, negotiating television contracts, disciplining individuals that own part or all of an NFL team, clubs, or employed individuals of an NFL club if they have violated league by-laws or committed "conduct detrimental to the welfare of the League or professional football". The commissioner can, in the event of misconduct by a party associated with the league, suspend individuals, hand down a fine of up to US$500,000, cancel contracts with the league, and award or strip teams of draft picks.

In extreme cases, the commissioner can offer recommendations to the NFL's executive committee, up to and including the "cancellation or forfeiture" of a club's franchise or any other action, he deems necessary. The commissioner can also issue sanctions up to and including a lifetime ban from the league if an individual connected to the NFL has bet on games or failed to notify the league of conspiracies or plans to bet on or fix games. The current Commissioner of the National Football League is Roger Goodell, who was elected in 2006 after Paul Tagliabue, the previous commissioner, retired.

Teams 

The NFL consists of 32 clubs divided into two conferences of 16 teams each. Each conference is divided into four divisions of four clubs each. During the regular season, each team is allowed a maximum of 55 players on its roster; only 48 of these may be active (eligible to play) on game days. Each team can also have a sixteen-player practice squad separate from its main roster.

Each NFL club is granted a franchise, the league's authorization for the team to operate in its home city. This franchise covers 'Home Territory' (the 75 miles surrounding the city limits, or, if the team is within 100 miles of another league city, half the distance between the two cities) and 'Home Marketing Area' (Home Territory plus the rest of the state the club operates in, as well as the area the team operates its training camp in for the duration of the camp). Each NFL member has the exclusive right to host professional football games inside its Home Territory and the exclusive right to advertise, promote, and host events in its Home Marketing Area. There are a couple of exceptions to this rule, mostly relating to teams with close proximity to each other: teams that operate in the same city (e.g. New York City and Los Angeles) or the same state (e.g. California, Florida, and Texas) share the rights to the city's Home Territory and the state's Home Marketing Area, respectively.

Every NFL team is based in the contiguous United States. Although no team is based in a foreign country, the Jacksonville Jaguars began playing one home game a year at Wembley Stadium in London, England, in 2013 as part of the NFL International Series. The Jaguars' agreement with Wembley was originally set to expire in 2016 but was extended through 2020 prior to travel restrictions relating to the coronavirus. The Las Vegas Raiders (then in Oakland) played one game each in the 2018 and 2019 seasons in London, while each of the Los Angeles teams (Rams, Chargers) played a game there from 2016 to 2019.

Mexico also hosted an NFL regular-season game, a 2005 game between the San Francisco 49ers and Arizona Cardinals known as "Fútbol Americano", and 39 international preseason games were played from 1986 to 2005 as part of the American Bowl series. Three additional games have since been played in Mexico.

According to Forbes, the Dallas Cowboys, at approximately US$5 billion, are the most valuable NFL franchise and the most valuable sports team in the world. Also, 26 of the 32 NFL teams rank among the Top 50 most valuable sports teams in the world; and 16 of the NFL's owners are listed on the Forbes 400, the most of any sports league or organization.

The 32 teams are organized into eight geographic divisions of four teams each. These divisions are further organized into two conferences, the National Football Conference and the American Football Conference. The two-conference structure has its origins in a time when major American professional football was organized into two independent leagues, the National Football League and its younger rival, the American Football League. The leagues merged 1970, adopting the older league's name and reorganizing slightly to ensure the same number of teams in both conferences.

Season format 

The NFL season format consists of a three-week preseason, an 18-week regular season (each team plays 17 games), and a 14-team single-elimination playoff culminating in the Super Bowl, the league's championship game.

Preseason 

The NFL preseason begins with the Pro Football Hall of Fame Game, played at Tom Benson Hall of Fame Stadium in Canton. Each NFL team is required to schedule three preseason games. NFC teams must play at least two of these at home in odd numbered years and AFC teams must play at least two at home in even numbered years. However, the teams involved in the Hall of Fame game, as well as any team that played in an American Bowl game, play four preseason games. Preseason games are exhibition matches and do not count towards regular-season totals. Because the preseason does not count towards standings, teams generally do not focus on winning games; instead, they are used by coaches to evaluate their teams and by players to show their performance, both to their current team and to other teams if they get cut. The quality of preseason games has been criticized by some fans, who dislike having to pay full price for exhibition games, as well as by some players and coaches, who dislike the risk of injury the games have, while others have felt the preseason is a necessary part of the NFL season.

Regular season 

This chart of the 2021 season standings displays an application of the NFL scheduling formula. The Rams in 2021 (highlighted in green) finished in first place in the NFC West. Thus, in 2022, the Rams will play two games against each of its division rivals (highlighted in light blue), one game against each team in the NFC South and AFC West (highlighted in yellow), one game each against the first-place finishers in the NFC East and NFC North (highlighted in orange) and one game against the team who finished first in the AFC East (highlighted in pink).

Currently, the 14 opponents each team faces over the 17-game regular season schedule are set using a pre-determined formula: The league runs an 18-week, 272-game regular season. Since 2021, the season has begun the week after Labor Day (the first Monday in September) and concluded the week after New Year. The opening game of the season is normally a home game on a Thursday for the league's defending champion.

Most NFL games are played on Sundays, with a Monday night game typically held at least once a week and Thursday night games occurring on most weeks as well. NFL games are not normally played on Fridays or Saturdays until late in the regular season, as federal law prohibits professional football leagues from competing with college or high school football. Because high school and college teams typically play games on Friday and Saturday, respectively, the NFL cannot hold games on those days until the Friday before the third Saturday in December. While Saturday games late in the season are common, the league rarely holds Friday games, the most recent one being on Christmas Day in 2020. NFL games are rarely scheduled for Tuesday or Wednesday, and those days have only been used three times since 1948: in 2010, when a Sunday game was rescheduled to Tuesday due to a blizzard; in 2012, when the Kickoff game was moved from Thursday to Wednesday to avoid conflict with the Democratic National Convention; and in 2020, when a game was postponed from Sunday to Tuesday due to players testing positive for COVID-19.

NFL regular season matchups are determined according to a scheduling formula. Within a division, all four teams play 14 out of their 17 games against common opponents or each other– two games (home and away) are played against the other three teams in the division, while one game is held against all the members of a division from the NFC and a division from the AFC as determined by a rotating cycle (three years for the conference the team is in, and four years in the conference they are not in). Two of the other games are intraconference games, determined by the standings of the previous year – for example, if a team finishes first in its division, it will play two other first-place teams in its conference, while a team that finishes last would play two other last-place teams in the conference. The final game is an inter-conference based on a rotating cycle and determined by previous season's standings. In total, each team plays 17 games and has one bye week, where it does not play a game.

Although a team's home and away opponents are known by the end of the previous year's regular season, the exact dates and times for NFL games are not determined until much later because the league has to account for, among other things, the Major League Baseball postseason and local events that could pose a scheduling conflict with NFL games. During the 2010 season, over 500,000 potential schedules were created by computers, 5,000 of which were considered "playable schedules" and were reviewed by the NFL's scheduling team. After arriving at what they felt was the best schedule out of the group, nearly 50 more potential schedules were developed to try to ensure that the chosen schedule would be the best possible one.

Postseason 

Following the conclusion of the regular season, the NFL Playoffs, a 14-team single-elimination tournament, is then held. Seven teams are selected from each conference: the winners of each of the four divisions as well as three wild card teams (the three remaining teams with the best overall record, with tiebreakers in the event of two or more teams having the same record). These teams are seeded according to overall record and tiebreakers, with the division champions always ranking higher than the wild card teams. The top team (seeded one) from each conference are awarded a bye week, while the remaining six teams (seeded 2–7) from each conference compete in the first round of the playoffs, the Wild Card round, with the 2-seed competing against the 7-seed, the 3-seed competing against the 6-seed and the 4-seed competing against the 5-seed. The winners of the Wild Card round advance to the Divisional Round, which matches the lower seeded team against the 1-seed and the two remaining teams against each other. The winners of those games then compete in the Conference Championships, with the higher remaining seed hosting the lower remaining seed. The AFC and NFC champions then compete in the Super Bowl to determine the league champion.

The only other postseason event hosted by the NFL is the Pro Bowl, the league's all-star game. Since 2009, the Pro Bowl has been held the week before the Super Bowl; in previous years, the game was held the week following the Super Bowl, but in an effort to boost ratings, the game was moved to the week before. Because of this, players from the teams participating in the Super Bowl are exempt from participating in the game. The Pro Bowl is not considered as competitive as a regular-season game because the biggest concern of teams is to avoid injuries to the players.

Trophies and awards

Team trophies 

The National Football League has used three different trophies to honor its champion over its existence. The first trophy, the Brunswick-Balke Collender Cup, was donated to the NFL (then APFA) in 1920 by the Brunswick-Balke Collender Corporation. The trophy, the appearance of which is only known by its description as a "silver loving cup", was intended to be a traveling trophy and not to become permanent until a team had won at least three titles. The league awarded it to the Akron Pros, champions of the inaugural 1920 season; however, the trophy was discontinued and its current whereabouts are unknown.

A second trophy, the Ed Thorp Memorial Trophy, was issued by the NFL from 1934 to 1967. The trophy's namesake, Ed Thorp, was a referee in the league and a friend to many early league owners; upon his death in 1934, the league created the trophy to honor him. In addition to the main trophy, which would be in the possession of the current league champion, the league issued a smaller replica trophy to each champion, who would maintain permanent control over it. The current location of the Ed Thorp Memorial Trophy, long thought to be lost, is believed to be possessed by the Green Bay Packers Hall of Fame.

The current trophy of the NFL is the Vince Lombardi Trophy. The Super Bowl trophy was officially renamed in 1970 after Vince Lombardi, who as head coach led the Green Bay Packers to victories in the first two Super Bowls. Unlike the previous trophies, a new Vince Lombardi Trophy is issued to each year's champion, who maintains permanent control of it. Lombardi Trophies are made by Tiffany & Co. out of sterling silver and are worth anywhere from US$25,000 to US$300,000. Additionally, each player on the winning team as well as coaches and personnel are awarded Super Bowl rings to commemorate their victory. The winning team chooses the company that makes the rings; each ring design varies, with the NFL mandating certain ring specifications (which have a degree of room for deviation), in addition to requiring the Super Bowl logo be on at least one side of the ring. The losing team are also awarded rings, which must be no more than half as valuable as the winners' rings, but those are almost never worn.

The conference champions receive trophies for their achievement. The champions of the NFC receive the George Halas Trophy, named after Chicago Bears founder George Halas, who is also considered one of the co-founders of the NFL. The AFC champions receive the Lamar Hunt Trophy, named after Lamar Hunt, the founder of the Kansas City Chiefs and the principal founder of the American Football League. Players on the winning team also receive a conference championship ring.

Player and coach awards 

The NFL recognizes a number of awards for its players and coaches at its annual NFL Honors presentation. The most prestigious award is the AP Most Valuable Player (MVP) award. Other major awards include the AP Offensive Player of the Year, AP Defensive Player of the Year, AP Comeback Player of the Year, and the AP Offensive and Defensive Rookie of the Year awards. Another prestigious award is the Walter Payton Man of the Year Award, which recognizes a player's off-field work in addition to his on-field performance. The NFL Coach of the Year award is the highest coaching award. The NFL also gives out weekly awards such as the FedEx Air & Ground NFL Players of the Week and the Pepsi MAX NFL Rookie of the Week awards.

Media coverage 

In the United States, the National Football League has television contracts with five networks: ABC, CBS, ESPN, Fox, and NBC. Collectively, these contracts cover every regular season and postseason game. In general, CBS televises afternoon games in which the away team is an AFC team, and Fox carries afternoon games in which the away team belongs to the NFC. These afternoon games are not carried on all affiliates, as multiple games are being played at once; each network affiliate is assigned one game per time slot, according to a complicated set of rules. Since 2011, the league has reserved the right to give Sunday games that, under the contract, would normally air on one network to the other network (known as "flexible scheduling"). The only way to legally watch a regionally televised game not being carried on the local network affiliates is to purchase NFL Sunday Ticket, the league's out-of-market sports package, which is only available to subscribers to the DirecTV satellite service. The league also provides RedZone, an omnibus telecast that cuts to the most relevant plays in each game, live as they happen.

In addition to the regional games, the league also has packages of telecasts, mostly in prime time, that are carried nationwide. NBC broadcasts the primetime Sunday Night Football package', which includes the Thursday NFL Kickoff game that starts the regular season and a primetime Thanksgiving Day game. ESPN carries all Monday Night Football games. The NFL's own network, NFL Network, broadcasts a series titled Thursday Night Football, which was originally exclusive to the network, but which in recent years has had several games simulcast on CBS (since 2014) and NBC (since 2016) (except the Thanksgiving and kickoff games, which remain exclusive to NBC). For the 2017 season, the NFL Network will broadcast 18 regular season games under its Thursday Night Football brand, 16 Thursday evening contests (10 of which are simulcast on either NBC or CBS) as well as one of the NFL International Series games on a Sunday morning and one of the 2017 Christmas afternoon games. In addition, 10 of the Thursday night games will be streamed live on Amazon Prime. In 2017, the NFL games occupied the top three rates for a 30-second advertisement: $699,602 for Sunday Night Football, $550,709 for Thursday Night Football (NBC), and $549,791 for Thursday Night Football (CBS).

The Super Bowl television rights are rotated on a three-year basis between CBS, Fox, and NBC. In 2011, all four stations signed new nine-year contracts with the NFL, each running until 2022; CBS, Fox, and NBC are estimated by Forbes to pay a combined total of US$3 billion a year, while ESPN will pay US$1.9 billion a year. The league also has deals with Spanish-language broadcasters NBC Universo, Fox Deportes, and ESPN Deportes, which air Spanish language dubs of their respective English-language sister networks' games. The league's contracts do not cover preseason games, which individual teams are free to sell to local stations directly; a minority of preseason games are distributed among the league's national television partners.

Through the 2014 season, the NFL had a blackout policy in which games were 'blacked out' on local television in the home team's area if the home stadium was not sold out. Clubs could elect to set this requirement at only 85%, but they would have to give more ticket revenue to the visiting team; teams could also request a specific exemption from the NFL for the game. The NFL announced in March 2015 that it would suspend its blackout policy for at least the 2015 season. According to Nielsen, the NFL regular season since 2012 was watched by at least 200 million individuals, accounting for 80% of all television households in the United States and 69% of all potential viewers in the United States. NFL regular season games accounted for 31 out of the top 32 most-watched programs in the fall season and an NFL game ranked as the most-watched television show in all 17 weeks of the regular season. At the local level, NFL games were the highest-ranked shows in NFL markets 92% of the time. Super Bowls account for the 22 most-watched programs (based on total audience) in US history, including a record 167 million people that watched Super Bowl XLVIII, the conclusion to the 2013 season.

In addition to radio networks run by each NFL team, select NFL games are broadcast nationally by Westwood One (known as Dial Global for the 2012 season). These games are broadcast on over 500 networks, giving all NFL markets access to each primetime game. The NFL's deal with Westwood One was extended in 2012 and continued through 2017. Other NFL games are nationally distributed by Compass Media Networks and Sports USA Radio Network under contracts with individual teams.

Some broadcasting innovations have either been introduced or popularized during NFL telecasts. Among them, the Skycam camera system was used for the first time in a live telecast, at a 1984 preseason NFL game in San Diego between the Chargers and 49ers, and televised by CBS. Commentator John Madden famously used a telestrator during games between the early 1980s to the mid-2000s, boosting the device's popularity.

The NFL, as a one-time experiment, distributed the October 25, 2015, International Series game from Wembley Stadium in London between the Buffalo Bills and Jacksonville Jaguars. The game was live streamed on the Internet exclusively via Yahoo!, except for over-the-air broadcasts on the local CBS-TV affiliates in the Buffalo and Jacksonville markets.

In 2015, the NFL began sponsoring a series of public service announcements to bring attention to domestic abuse and sexual assault in response to what was seen as poor handling of incidents of violence by players.

The NFL finished the new contract negotiation for the media rights deal worth over $110 billion on March 18, 2021. In this contract, ABC would be eligible to broadcast the Super Bowl on U.S. television for the first time since it broadcast Super Bowl XL after the end of the 2005 NFL season. Also in current agreement, Amazon would be the new home for Thursday Night Football starting in 2023.

On August 25, 2021, the NFL sent a memo to all 32 teams that only fully vaccinated personnel, with a maximum of 50 people, will have access to locker rooms while players are present on game days. The memo also stated that non-club-affiliated media are not permitted in the locker room.

On February 9, 2022, as part of efforts to increase the sport's international reach, the NFL announced that Munich will host its first regular-season game in Germany in 2022.

Draft 

Each April (excluding 2014 when it took place in May), the NFL holds a draft of college players. The draft consists of seven rounds, with each of the 32 clubs getting one pick in each round. The draft order for non-playoff teams is determined by regular-season record; among playoff teams, teams are first ranked by the furthest round of the playoffs they reached, and then are ranked by regular-season record. For example, any team that reached the divisional round will be given a higher pick than any team that reached the conference championships, but will be given a lower pick than any team that did not make the divisional round. The Super Bowl champion always drafts last, and the losing team from the Super Bowl always drafts next-to-last. All potential draftees must be at least three years removed from high school in order to be eligible for the draft. Underclassmen that have met that criterion to be eligible for the draft must write an application to the NFL by January 15 renouncing their remaining college eligibility. Clubs can trade away picks for future draft picks, but cannot trade the rights to players they have selected in previous drafts.

Aside from the seven picks each club gets, compensatory draft picks are given to teams that have lost more compensatory free agents than they have gained. These are spread out from rounds 3 to 7, and a total of 32 are given. Clubs are required to make their selection within a certain period of time, the exact time depending on which round the pick is made in. If they fail to do so on time, the clubs behind them can begin to select their players in order, but they do not lose the pick outright. This happened in the 2003 draft, when the Minnesota Vikings failed to make their selection on time. The Jacksonville Jaguars and Carolina Panthers were able to make their picks before the Vikings were able to use theirs. Selected players are only allowed to negotiate contracts with the team that picked them, but if they choose not to sign they become eligible for the next year's draft. Under the current collective bargaining contract, all contracts to drafted players must be four-year deals with a club option for a fifth. Contracts themselves are limited to a certain amount of money, depending on the exact draft pick the player was selected with. Players who were draft eligible but not picked in the draft are free to sign with any club.

The NFL operates several other drafts in addition to the NFL draft. The league holds a supplemental draft annually. Clubs submit emails to the league stating the player they wish to select and the round they will do so, and the team with the highest bid wins the rights to that player. The exact order is determined by a lottery held before the draft, and a successful bid for a player will result in the team forfeiting the rights to its pick in the equivalent round of the next NFL draft. Players are only eligible for the supplemental draft after being granted a petition for special eligibility. The league holds expansion drafts, the most recent happening in 2002 when the Houston Texans began play as an expansion team. Other drafts held by the league include an allocation draft in 1950 to allocate players from several teams that played in the dissolved All-America Football Conference and a supplemental draft in 1984 to give NFL teams the rights to players who had been eligible for the main draft but had not been drafted because they had signed contracts with the United States Football League or Canadian Football League.

Like the other major sports leagues in the United States, the NFL maintains protocol for a disaster draft. In the event of a 'near disaster' (less than 15 players killed or disabled) that caused the club to lose a quarterback, they could draft one from a team with at least three quarterbacks. In the event of a 'disaster' (15 or more players killed or disabled) that results in a club's season being canceled, a restocking draft would be held. Neither of these protocols has ever had to be implemented.

Free agency 
Free agents in the National Football League are divided into restricted free agents, who have three accrued seasons and whose current contract has expired, and unrestricted free agents, who have four or more accrued seasons and whose contract has expired. An accrued season is defined as "six or more regular-season games on a club's active/inactive, reserved/injured or reserve/physically unable to perform lists". Restricted free agents are allowed to negotiate with other clubs besides their former club, but the former club has the right to match any offer. If they choose not to, they are compensated with draft picks. Unrestricted free agents are free to sign with any club, and no compensation is owed if they sign with a different club.

Clubs are given one franchise tag to offer to any unrestricted free agent. The franchise tag is a one-year deal that pays the player 120% of his previous contract or no less than the average of the five highest-paid players at his position, whichever is greater. There are two types of franchise tags: exclusive tags, which do not allow the player to negotiate with other clubs, and non-exclusive tags, which allow the player to negotiate with other clubs but gives his former club the right to match any offer and two first-round draft picks if they decline to match it.

Clubs also have the option to use a transition tag, which is similar to the non-exclusive franchise tag but offers no compensation if the former club refuses to match the offer. Due to that stipulation, the transition tag is rarely used, even with the removal of the "poison pill" strategy (offering a contract with stipulations that the former club would be unable to match) that essentially ended the usage of the tag league-wide. Each club is subject to a salary cap, which is set at US$188.2 million for the 2019 season, US$11 million more than that of 2018.

Members of clubs' practice squads, despite being paid by and working for their respective clubs, are also simultaneously a kind of free agent and are able to sign to any other club's active roster (provided their new club is not their previous club's next opponent within a set number of days) without compensation to their previous club; practice squad players cannot be signed to other clubs' practice squads, however, unless released by their original club first.

See also 

 American football in the United States
 List of NFL champions (1920–1969)
 List of Super Bowl champions (1966–present)
 National Football League (1902)
 National Football League All-Decade Teams
 National Football League Cheerleading
 National Football League controversies
 National Football League franchise moves and mergers
 National Football League records
 National Football League 75th Anniversary All-Time Team
 National Football League 100th Anniversary All-Time Team
 NFL Europe
 NFL Films
 International Player Pathway Program (IPPP)
 List of NFL franchise owners
 List of Pro Football Hall of Fame inductees

References

Explanatory notes

Citations

Bibliography

External links 

 
 Pro Football Reference – historical stats of teams, players and coaches in the NFL
 Jared Dubin (April 28, 2015), "NFL ends tax exempt status after 73 years: 3 things to know", CBS Sports

 
1920 establishments in Ohio
Cooperatives in the United States
Organizations based in New York City
Sports leagues established in 1920
501(c)(6) nonprofit organizations